Zoe Brown may refer to:

Zoe Brown (athlete), Northern Irish pole vaulter and competitor at Athletics at the 2014 Commonwealth Games – Women's pole vault
Zoe Brown, character in Love Island (2015 TV series)
Zoe Lowenthal Brown (born 1927), American photographer